Calliaster baccatus, the cobbled starfish, is a species of starfish in the family Goniasteridae.

Description
The cobbled starfish is a large brick-coloured starfish which grows up to 200mm across. Its central area is covered with coarse granules and its upper arms are edged with large squarish tiles which may be smooth or have protruding granules. The tiles on the outer edged of the arms usually have protruding granules.

Distribution
It is only found from Lamberts Bay to Port Elizabeth on the South African coast, in 9-23m. It appears to be endemic to this area.

Ecology
This starfish is found on rocky reefs, mostly along the sandy margins. Its food and reproductive habits are unknown.

References

Goniasteridae
Starfish described in 1889